The 1937 Holy Cross Crusaders football team represented the College of the Holy Cross during the 1937 college football season. The Crusaders were led by fifth-year head coach Eddie Anderson and played their home games at Fitton Field in Worcester, Massachusetts and Fenway Park in Boston. Despite losing key defensive players from the year prior, the Crusaders' defense was one of the best in the country, allowing only three touchdowns all season. Holy Cross went undefeated on the year, with a record of 8–0–2, finishing tied for 14th in the final AP Poll.

Schedule

References

Holy Cross
Holy Cross Crusaders football seasons
College football undefeated seasons
Holy Cross Crusaders football